"Because They're Young" is an instrumental performed by Duane Eddy. It appeared on his 1960 album, $1,000,000 Worth of Twang.

Background
"Because They're Young" was written by Aaron Schroeder, Don Costa, and Wally Gold, and produced by Lee Hazlewood and Lester Sill.  It ranked #37 on Billboard magazine's Top Hot 100 songs of 1960.

Chart performance

Other versions
James Darren released a vocal version as a single in 1960.  It went to #29 in the UK and #4 in New Zealand.
Helen Shapiro put out her rendition on 10 March 1962.

Popular culture
The song was featured in the 1960 movie, Because They're Young sung by Jimmy Darren and arranged by Ernie Freeman.

Others
The song is also the theme music of "De Pre Historie", a Flemish nostalgia music radio program of the VRT, as well as the similarly titled television series.

References

1960 songs
1960 singles
Songs written by Aaron Schroeder
Songs written by Wally Gold
Duane Eddy songs
James Darren songs
Song recordings produced by Lee Hazlewood
Song recordings produced by Lester Sill
1960s instrumentals
Radio theme songs
Music television series theme songs